Pedavena is a comune (municipality) in the province of Belluno in the Italian region of Veneto.
 
Pedavena borders the following municipalities: Feltre, Fonzaso, Sovramonte.

References 

Cities and towns in Veneto